Impatiens arguta, the toothed busy lizzie, is a species of flowering plant in the balsam family Balsaminaceae. It is native to Bhutan, Nepal, Myanmar, India and China. It has deeply-veined, elliptic, slightly toothed leaves. Delicate lavender-blue or pink flowers appear in summer. As with other Impatiens species, the stems and leaves are succulent and fleshy.

This plant is cultivated as an ornamental. Plants may become evergreen in warmer climates.

References

arguta
Flora of Bhutan
Flora of China
Flora of India (region)
Flora of Myanmar
Flora of Nepal